Mingus Mountain Academy is a private, all-girls alternative high school in Prescott Valley, Arizona, United States. It is operated by Sequel Youth and Family Services. It is one of three Arizona Interscholastic Association-member single-sex high schools, along with Brophy College Preparatory/Xavier College Preparatory. Mingus Mountain Academy is also a behavioral treatment center for troubled youth. Many girls who attend the academy have come from Juvenile Hall, the streets, or past placements. This treatment facility offers girls skills to use after they leave Mingus.

References

Private high schools in Arizona
Schools in Yavapai County, Arizona